During the Global Financial Crisis and subsequent Great Recession, housing prices in the United States declined. Despite the decline in prices, many traditional purchasers of single-family homes—individual families—remained priced out of the market, leading to concerns that a lack of demand would cause home prices to collapse, exacerbating the recession. In 2012, in an effort to create demand, Fannie Mae placed several thousand foreclosed-upon homes for sale in a single transaction. This sale helped establish single-family property portfolios as a potential investment for large institutional investors, as opposed to one chiefly appealing to individual families and small-time investors.

Before the broad declines in housing prices caused by the financial crisis and recession, relatively high property costs and the decentralized geography of individual homes made them unappealing as an asset class for direct investment. Broadly, financial professionals and real estate investors, such as Sam Zell, were skeptical that they could function as portfolios, even as some firms began to purchase homes en-masse. This push was "led" by private equity and alternative investment firm Blackstone, which founded Invitation Homes to purchase individual homes in depressed markets around the United States. These markets were concentrated in the Sun Belt cities, which include Atlanta, Phoenix, and Orlando. As of 2022, major single-family home owners include Invitation Homes, Pretium, and American Homes 4 Rent.

Large, single-family home investors and operators have received criticism from tenants for high rents, poor conditions, and poor treatment and from politicians and the broader public for constraining the housing supply and worsening the ongoing housing shortage in the United States.

References

Housing in the United States
Private equity
The Blackstone Group
Great Recession